Veerle a female given name. People so named include:

Veerle Baetens (born 1978), Belgian actress and singer
Veerle Casteleyn (born 1978), Belgian musical theatre performer and ballerina
Veerle Dejaeghere (born 1973), Belgian runner
Veerle Ingels (born 1981), Belgian racing cyclist
Veerle Wouters (born 1974), Belgian politician

References